Przemysław Cichoń (born October 25, 1978) is a Polish footballer (midfielder) playing currently for Korona Kielce.

Clubs 
 1993-2000  Korona Kielce
 2000-2002  KSZO Ostrowiec Świętokrzyski
 2003-2007  Korona Kielce
 2008-      Pelikan Łowicz

References

1978 births
Living people
Polish footballers
Korona Kielce players
KSZO Ostrowiec Świętokrzyski players
Sportspeople from Kielce
Association football midfielders